Ottapalam (Code: OTP) is a railway station in Ottapalam, Palakkad district, Kerala and falls under the Palakkad railway division of the Southern Railway Zone, Indian Railways.

History 
Ottapalam station was opened in 1904.

The station received a makeover in early 2021 with several murals depicting the history, culture, and architecture of the region, as well as notable people from Ottapalam. The murals were created by artists Ambili Thekkedath and T.S. Sanu of Deva Creations. Among the people featured on the station's murals are C. Sankaran Nair, V. P. Menon, K.R. Narayanan, Chembai Vaidyanatha Bhagavathar, Mani Madhava Chakyar, P. Kunhiraman Nair and Kunchan Nambiar with his Killikurissimangalam house. There are also murals depicting Varikkaserri Mana, the old Ottapalam courthouse building, and major local festivals such as Chinakkathur Pooram, and art forms such as Kathakali and Ottamthullal. There is also a mural depicting the first conference of the Kerala Pradesh Congress Committee, which was held in Ottapalam in 1921.

References

Ottapalam
Railway stations in Palakkad district
Railway stations opened in 1904